Meydan-e Tirzhandarmari (also Romanized as Meydān-e Tīrzhāndārmarī) is a village in Kahrizak Rural District, Kahrizak District, Ray County, Tehran Province, Iran. At the 2006 census, its population was 14, in 4 families.

References 

Populated places in Ray County, Iran